John Hervey may refer to:

John Hervey (c.1353-c.1411), MP for Bedfordshire
John Hervey, 1st Earl of Bristol (1665–1751), Member of Parliament (MP) for Bury St Edmunds
John Hervey, 2nd Baron Hervey (1696–1743), son of the above, also MP for Bury St Edmunds
John Hervey, 7th Marquess of Bristol (1954–1999), descendant of the above
John Hervey, Lord Hervey (1757–1796), British diplomat
John Hervey (died 1680) (1616–1680), English courtier and politician
John Hervey (1696-1764), British MP for Wallingford and Reigate
John L. Hervey (1870–1947), American equine historian

See also
John Harvey (disambiguation)